Blood Brothers is a 1996 documentary film made by filmmaker Ernie Fritz that chronicles a brief reunion of Bruce Springsteen with The E Street Band in 1995. The film was nominated in 1997 for a Grammy for "Best Music Video - Long Form"

In 1989, Springsteen had decided that he wanted to explore working with a different set of musicians and he placed his long association with The E Street Band on indefinite hiatus.  Between 1989 and 1995 - he recorded and toured with other musicians. In 1995, he decided to reconvene the E Street Band for a week of recording sessions as well as a couple of New York City promotional concert appearances.  The recordings were to add a few new tracks to Springsteen's upcoming 1995 Greatest Hits release.  After the brief reunion, Springsteen then went on his own way again.  The next reunion was not until 1999's Reunion Tour and 2002's The Rising album.

Fritz documented the entire period - capturing Springsteen and manager/producer Jon Landau deciding what songs to put on Greatest Hits album, working on arrangements of the new songs, the recording sessions themselves and performances at the promotional shows.

Critical reaction to the Blood Brothers documentary was very positive.  TV Guide called it "superlative ... more than a record of a legendary band's reunion. It offers a glimpse of Springsteen that fans rarely see."

One writer for the tabloid The New York Post offered his personal opinion on one aspect of the content captured in the film rather than on its merits as a documentary, saying "It makes one a little uneasy to see how quickly the members of the band forgive their former employer, for a chance to work for a few days with him again."

Blood Brothers premiered on March 3, 1996 on the Disney Channel.  It was released on Laserdisc on October 1, 1996, on VHS on November 19, 1996 (the packaging for which contained a Blood Brothers EP in CD form), and on DVD on January 16, 2001.

References

External links 
 

1996 films
Bruce Springsteen
Documentary films about singers
1990s English-language films